The 1997 Luxembourg Grand Prix (formally the Grosser Preis von Luxemburg 1997) was a Formula One motor race held at the Nürburgring, Nürburg, Germany on 28 September 1997. It was the fifteenth race of the 1997 Formula One World Championship.

The 67-lap race was won by Canadian Jacques Villeneuve, driving a Williams-Renault. Frenchman Jean Alesi finished second in a Benetton-Renault, with Villeneuve's German teammate Heinz-Harald Frentzen third. Though Villeneuve went on to win the 1997 Drivers' Championship, this turned out to be his 11th and final Formula One victory and, the last for a Canadian driver.

Qualifying report
Qualifying saw Mika Häkkinen take pole position in the McLaren-Mercedes - the first-ever for the Finnish driver, the first for McLaren since the 1993 Australian Grand Prix, and the first for Mercedes (as an engine supplier or constructor) since the 1955 Italian Grand Prix. Villeneuve was alongside on the front row, while his Williams teammate Heinz-Harald Frentzen shared the second row with Giancarlo Fisichella in the Jordan. Michael Schumacher, leading Villeneuve in the Drivers' Championship by one point, was fifth in his Ferrari, sharing the third row with David Coulthard in the second McLaren. The top ten was completed by Gerhard Berger in the Benetton, Ralf Schumacher in the second Jordan, Rubens Barrichello in the Stewart, and Jean Alesi in the second Benetton.

Qualifying classification

Race report
At the start Häkkinen led away while teammate Coulthard jumped from sixth to second, ahead of Villeneuve.

Meanwhile, Michael Schumacher moved alongside Fisichella, while Ralf Schumacher made a fast start to be alongside both cars going into the first corner. However, Ralf squeezed his Jordan teammate Fisichella for room, leaving the Italian driver with nowhere to go. The resultant collision saw Ralf's car launch into the air, and come down on top of Michael's Ferrari. Also involved was the Minardi of Ukyo Katayama, who was unsighted by the dust and ploughed into Fisichella's car. Ralf, Fisichella and Katayama all retired immediately, while Michael continued for two laps before pulling into the pits with suspension damage.

With Frentzen dropping back after banging wheels with Villeneuve and knocking off his ignition switch, and Berger cutting the first corner to avoid the aforementioned collision, Barrichello and Alesi moved into fourth and fifth respectively, followed by Jan Magnussen in the second Stewart. The top six remained unchanged until the first round of pit stops, during which Alesi was leapfrogged by Magnussen and Damon Hill in the Arrows.

At half-distance, Häkkinen led Coulthard by around 12 seconds, with Villeneuve four seconds behind the Scottish driver. Then, at the start of lap 43, Coulthard's engine blew. Häkkinen suffered the same failure moments later, putting Villeneuve in the lead. Both Stewarts also retired at around this time, Magnussen suffering a driveshaft failure and Barrichello's gearbox breaking, while Hill had stalled during his pit stop. This left all four Renault-powered cars in the top four, with Alesi second, Frentzen third and Berger fourth, while Pedro Diniz moved into fifth in the second Arrows, just ahead of the Prost of Olivier Panis, in his first race back after breaking his legs in Canada.

Villeneuve eventually took the chequered flag 11.7 seconds ahead of Alesi, with Frentzen a further 1.7 seconds back. Berger finished three seconds behind Frentzen, but 27 seconds ahead of Diniz. The Brazilian driver held off Panis, who in turn held off Johnny Herbert in the Sauber and Hill for the final point.

The win gave Villeneuve a nine-point lead over Michael Schumacher in the Drivers' Championship with two races left to run, while Williams extended their lead over Ferrari in the Constructors' Championship to 26 points, needing just six more for their ninth title.

Race classification

Championship standings after the race

Drivers' Championship standings

Constructors' Championship standings

References

Luxembourg Grand Prix
Luxembourg Grand Prix
Luxembourg Grand Prix, 1997
Sport in Rhineland-Palatinate
Luxembourg Grand Prix